|}

References 

Binmaley
Buildings and structures in Pangasinan